HMS Capel was a , built in the United States as a , and transferred to the Royal Navy under the terms of Lend-Lease, which served in World War II.

The ship was laid down as USS Wintle (DE-266) on 11 March 1943 by the Boston Navy Yard, Boston, Massachusetts, and launched on 22 April 1943, sponsored by Mrs. Mary Clyde Wintle. On 14 June 1943 the ship was allocated to the United Kingdom; and she was transferred to the Royal Navy and commissioned as HMS Capel on 16 August 1943. The ship was named after Admiral Sir Thomas Bladen Capel (1776-1853).

Service history
Capel was attached to 1st Escort Group based at Belfast from 9 April 1944.

After patrols in the area between the Scottish Isles and the Irish Sea, Capel was anchored in Moelfre Bay, Anglesey to await "D-Day". She sailed on 5 May 1944 to join the massive anti-submarine screen patrolling the western end of the English Channel, in order to protect the Normandy landings of 6 June 1944. Capel returned to Belfast on 18 June to rest.

After the port of Cherbourg was captured and cleared the Capel and her Escort Group escorted convoys across the Channel, to and from Cherbourg with rest periods spent at Plymouth. In late 1944 the group shifted operations to the eastern end of the Channel, patrolling the convoy route to the newly liberated port of Antwerp.

Affleck was towed to port, but declared a total loss, while Capel sank at position . The survivors were picked up by American MTBs and taken to Cherbourg. Her commander, Lieutenant B.G. Heslop, DSC, eight officers, and 67 men were lost.

References 
 The Captain Class Frigates Association
 uboat.net HMS Capel
 
 

 

Captain-class frigates
Evarts-class destroyer escorts
World War II frigates of the United Kingdom
Ships built in Boston
1943 ships
Ships transferred from the United States Navy to the Royal Navy
Ships sunk by German submarines in World War II
World War II shipwrecks in the English Channel
Maritime incidents in December 1944